Brazilian Institute of the Environment and Renewable Natural Resources (IBAMA) is the Brazilian Ministry of the Environment's administrative arm. IBAMA supports anti-deforestation of the Amazon, and implements laws against deforestation where the government ceases to implement. IBAMA works to keep the forest from loggers, farming, agricultural farm grazing and anything that would threaten the Amazon.

Spix's macaw

Among IBAMA's diverse environmental and natural resources activities, it manages The Working Group for the Recovery of the Spix's macaw and the associated Ararinha Azul project for conserving one of the rarest birds in the world. However the last Spix's macaw living in the wilderness disappeared in 2000 and the species became extinct in the wild.

Weakening

See also
Belo Monte Dam
Environmentalism in Rio Grande do Sul

References

External links
 IBAMA Website
 ICMBio Website

Environmental agencies in Brazil
Environmental agencies
Natural resources agencies
Nature conservation in Brazil
Executive branch of Brazil
Government agencies established in 1989
1989 establishments in Brazil